Alfred von Ingelheim's Dramatic Life is a 1921 German silent film directed by Erik Lund and starring Bruno Kastner, Maria Zelenka and Hanni Weisse.

The film's art direction was by Siegfried Wroblewsky.

Cast
 Bruno Kastner as Alfred von Ingelheim
 Maria Zelenka as Backfisch
 Hanni Weisse as Hofdame
 Leopold von Ledebur as König
 Vera Lessing
 Frida Richard
 Fritz Richard
 Ernst Rückert

References

Bibliography

External links

1921 films
Films of the Weimar Republic
German silent feature films
Films directed by Erik Lund
German black-and-white films